Gastromyzon contractus is a species of river loach in the genus Gastromyzon. It is endemic to the Kapuas River basin, western Borneo. It is a small fish growing to  SL.

References

Gastromyzon
Freshwater fish of Indonesia
Endemic fauna of Borneo
Endemic fauna of Indonesia
Fish described in 1982